Péter Holoda (born 9 January 1996) is a Hungarian swimmer. He competed in the men's 4 × 100 metre freestyle relay event at the 2016 Summer Olympics.

References

External links
 
 
 

1996 births
Living people
Hungarian male swimmers
Olympic swimmers of Hungary
Swimmers at the 2016 Summer Olympics
Sportspeople from Debrecen
World Aquatics Championships medalists in swimming
Hungarian male freestyle swimmers
Swimmers at the 2020 Summer Olympics
Competitors at the 2022 World Games
World Games gold medalists
20th-century Hungarian people
21st-century Hungarian people